James Thorpe (born February 17, 1985 in East Longmeadow, Massachusetts) is an American soccer player.

Career

College
Thorpe played college soccer at Franklin Pierce College, where he was named Conference Goalkeeper of the Year and as Freshman of the Year in 2004, was awarded NSCAA/adidas All-American Third Team honors, was named to the NSCAA/adidas All-New England and All-Northeast-10 first team as a sophomore and a junior, and was also NE-10 Goalkeeper of the Year three years in a row. He also led Franklin Pierce to its first-ever NCAA Division II National Championship in his senior year in 2007.

Professional
Thorpe was signed to a developmental contract by D.C. United on March 27, 2008, but did not see any first team action in league play. His lone first team appearance came in United's 2-0 loss to Cruz Azul in the CONCACAF Champions League, in which he received two yellow cards and was sent off. He also played in seven games for DC in the MLS Reserve Division before being released at the end of the season.

He subsequently signed for Western Mass Pioneers in the USL Second Division for the 2009 season.

Honors

D.C. United
Lamar Hunt U.S. Open Cup (1): 2008

External links
Pioneers bio
MLS Player Profile

References

1985 births
Living people
People from East Longmeadow, Massachusetts
American soccer players
Franklin Pierce Ravens men's soccer players
Colorado Rapids U-23 players
Cape Cod Crusaders players
D.C. United players
Western Mass Pioneers players
USL League Two players
USL Second Division players
Soccer players from Massachusetts
D.C. United draft picks
Association football goalkeepers
Rhode Island Rams coaches
Boston College Eagles women's soccer coaches
Rhode Island Rams men's soccer
Rhode Island Rams women's soccer
UMass Lowell River Hawks coaches
UMass Lowell River Hawks soccer
Evansville Purple Aces coaches
Holy Cross Crusaders men's soccer coaches